Kenneth Stuart Williams (13 September 1870 – 25 November 1935) was a Reform Party Member of Parliament in New Zealand.  He was Minister of Public Works from 1926 to 1928 in the Reform Government.

Early life
Williams was born in Pakaraka in the Bay of Islands in 1870 to parents John William Williams and Sarah Busby. He was a grandson of the missionary Henry Williams and of James Busby. He was educated at Heretaunga School in Hastings and Christ's College in Christchurch.

Political career

In 1903–09, he was chairman of Waiapu County. 
He won the Bay of Plenty electorate in a 1920 by-election after the death of the previous MP, William MacDonald; and held it  until 1935. He was elected unopposed three times; in 1922, 1925 & 1931; in 1928 he was opposed by Alexander Moncur for Labour.

He was Minister of Public Works (12 June 1926 – 10 December 1928) in the Reform Government under Gordon Coates, and briefly Minister of Lands, and Commissioner of State Forests (28 November 1928 – 10 December 1928).

In 1934, he had decided to retire at the end of the term because of health problems from an accident, but died on 25 November 1935 at a garden party held in his honour, just two days before the 1935 general election.

In 1935, Williams was awarded the King George V Silver Jubilee Medal.

Notes

References

1870 births
1935 deaths
Reform Party (New Zealand) MPs
Members of the Cabinet of New Zealand
Members of the New Zealand House of Representatives
New Zealand MPs for North Island electorates
People educated at Christ's College, Christchurch
Unsuccessful candidates in the 1919 New Zealand general election